The 2012 My AOD Favourites Awards, presented by Astro in Malaysia, was an awards ceremony that recognised the best Hong Kong TVB television drama series that had aired on Malaysia's Astro On Demand (AOD) in 2012. 

The ceremony took place on 2 December 2012 at the Sunway Convention Centre in Kuala Lumpur, Malaysia. It was broadcast live to Malaysian audiences through AOD.

Winners and nominees
Top five nominees are in bold.

References

TVB original programming
2012 television awards
2012 in Malaysian television
2012 in Hong Kong television

zh:MY AOD我的最爱颁奖典礼2012